The Salado Springs salamander (Eurycea chisholmensis) is a species of salamander in the family Plethodontidae. It is endemic to the vicinity of Salado, Texas.

Its natural habitat is freshwater springs. It has been found only from a few springs that feed Salado Creek in Bell County, Texas. These springs were important along the historical Chisholm Trail, from which the name of the species is derived.
It is threatened by habitat loss.

References

 Chippindale, P.T., A.H. Price, Wiens, J.J. & Hillis, D.M. (2000): Phylogenetic relationships of central Texas hemidactyliine plethodontid salamanders, genus Eurycea, and a taxonomic revision of the group. Herpetological Monographs 14: 1-80.
 Hillis, D.M., Chamberlain, D.A., Wilcox, T.P., & Chippindale, P.T. (2001): A new species of subterranean blind salamander (Plethodontidae: Hemidactyliini: Eurycea: Typhlomolge) from Austin, Texas, and a systematic revision of central Texas paedomorphic salamanders. Herpetologica 57: 266–280.

ESA threatened species
Eurycea
Amphibians of the United States
Endemic fauna of Texas
Amphibians described in 2000
Taxonomy articles created by Polbot